19 Lyncis is a triple star system in the northern constellation of Lynx. The first two are located around 680–690 light years away from the Sun, based on parallax measurements. Their radial velocity measurements are poorly constrained, but suggest the system is trending away from the Earth.

The primary, designated component A, is itself a double-lined spectroscopic binary system with an orbital period of 2.26 days and an eccentricity of 0.08. The more prominent member of this pair, component Aa, is a B-type main-sequence star with a stellar classification of B8 V. It has 3.33 times the mass of the Sun and is spinning with a projected rotational velocity of 70 km/s. Component B has a class of B9 V, an estimated 3.03 times the mass of the Sun, and is spinning rapidly with a projected rotational velocity of 275 km/s.

References

B-type main-sequence stars
Triple star systems
Lynx (constellation)
Durchmusterung objects
Lyncis, 19
057102 3
035783 5
2783 4